The R807 road is a regional road in Dublin, Ireland.

The official definition of the R807 from the Roads Act 1993 (Classification of Regional Roads) Order 2006 states:

R807: Clontarf Road, Dublin

Between its junction with R105 at Howth Road Fairview and its junction with R105 at Howth Road via Clontarf Road and James Larkin Road all in the city of Dublin.

See also
Roads in Ireland
Regional road

References

Regional roads in the Republic of Ireland
Roads in County Dublin